Courthouse–Seminary Neighborhood Historic District is a national historic district located at Cape Girardeau, Cape Girardeau County, Missouri.  The district encompasses 121 contributing buildings and 2 contributing sites in a predominantly residential section of Cape Girardeau.  It developed between about 1848 and 1948, and includes representative examples of Italianate, Queen Anne, Colonial Revival, Tudor Revival, Mission Revival, Late Gothic Revival, American Craftsman, and Art Deco style architecture. The district contains 1 1/2 and 2 1/2-story brick single-family homes, with multi-family homes and a few commercial buildings dispersed throughout. Located in the district is the separately listed Robert Felix and Elma Taylor Wichterich House, William Henry and Lilla Luce Harrison House, Huhn-Harrison House, B'Nai Israel Synagogue, St. Vincent de Paul Catholic Church, August and Amalia Shivelbine House, Glenn House, House at 323 Themis Street, and George Boardman Clark House.

It was listed on the National Register of Historic Places in 2010.

References

Historic districts on the National Register of Historic Places in Missouri
Colonial Revival architecture in Missouri
Tudor Revival architecture in Missouri
Mission Revival architecture in Missouri
Gothic Revival architecture in Missouri
Italianate architecture in Missouri
Queen Anne architecture in Missouri
Art Deco architecture in Missouri
Historic districts in Cape Girardeau County, Missouri
National Register of Historic Places in Cape Girardeau County, Missouri